John Michael Causey (born September 11, 1950) is an American politician who has served as the North Carolina Commissioner of Insurance since 2017. 

John Michael Causey, a North Carolina Republican, has run for state Insurance Commissioner five times between 1992 and 2016, losing each of the first four times in 1992, 1996, 2000, and 2012. In his 2016 campaign, his fifth campaign for the same office, he knocked off incumbent Wayne Goodwin in what was considered to be an upset, given his previous track record and Goodwin's incumbency.

Starting in 2017, Causey began cooperating with the FBI in the investigation of political corruption charges related to Greg Lindberg. After his conviction, Lindberg filed a lawsuit alleging Causey made materially false representations to the State Ethics Board of North Carolina, to the FBI and under oath in federal court. U.S. District Court Judge Catherine Eagles later dismissed the suit with prejudice.

Electoral history

References

1950 births
Living people
21st-century American politicians
North Carolina Commissioners of Insurance
North Carolina Republicans
High Point University alumni
People from Guilford County, North Carolina
State insurance commissioners of the United States